"L.G. Fuad" (abbreviation of "Let's Get Fucked Up and Die") is a song by American rock band Motion City Soundtrack, released in 2006 as the third and final single from the group's second studio album, Commit This to Memory (2005).

Background
"L.G. FUAD"—which stands for "Let's Get Fucked Up and Die"—grew out of a night on Motion City Soundtrack's 2003 UK tour with The All-American Rejects, in which the latter band's merchandise manager was severely inebriated. He stood on the merchandise stand and shouted what became the song's refrain. All involved found great humor in the "mantra", which went on to be printed on business cards as a joke. The song takes from the Promise Ring's song "Forget Me" and its lyrical mention of forget-me-nots and marigolds. The song was recorded at Seedy Underbelly Studios, a suburban home converted into a studio in the city's Valley Village region. The song's title, and the non-capitalization of "Fuad", is a reference to L.L.Bean: "The band might disagree with my recollection of things, but I swear I was trying to reference the L.L.Bean catalogues my sister subscribed to that were all over the apartment we shared," Pierre wrote on Twitter in 2019.

The song's music video was directed by Josh Thacker. It was released with the deluxe edition of Commit This to Memory, first issued on June 19, 2006, and included on the accompanying Hooray for the Madness DVD.

Personnel 
Adapted from Commit This to Memory liner notes.

Motion City Soundtrack
Justin Pierre – lead vocals, guitar
Joshua Cain – guitar, vocals
Jesse Johnson – Moog, keyboard
Matt Taylor – bass guitar, percussion, piano, vocals
Tony Thaxton – drums, vocals

Production
 Mark Hoppus – production
 Tom Lord-Alge – mixing
 Ryan Hewitt – engineer, co-production
 Eric Olsen – engineer
 Jacques Wait – engineer
 Chris Testa – assistant engineer
 Femio Hernandez – assistant mixing

References

2006 singles
2005 songs
Motion City Soundtrack songs
Epitaph Records singles
Songs written by Joshua Cain
Songs written by Justin Pierre